Who Is Harry Kellerman and Why Is He Saying Those Terrible Things About Me? is a 1971 American comedy-drama film directed by Ulu Grosbard and starring Dustin Hoffman.

It portrays a single day in the life of Georgie Soloway, played by Hoffman. Its narrative is stream of consciousness filled with both comedy and drama.

Plot
Georgie Soloway (Dustin Hoffman) is a rock music composer who experiences personal conflicts when trying to track down a man named Harry Kellerman, who had been spreading outrageous lies about him.  Soloway is a rich and successful man, who lives in a fancy penthouse apartment and seemingly has everything, but he is beginning to think he is losing his mind; he cannot sleep, women he has dated are rejecting him after getting calls from the mysterious "Harry", and he fantasizes about committing suicide by leaping off his balcony. Regular visits to his psychiatrist are not helping.  At night, he struggles with insomnia and can only sleep when his long-suffering accountant comes over and reads his earnings statements to him.  When he does sleep, he dreams again about jumping to his death.

As Georgie tries to make sense of his life, he thinks back on his experiences. Although Georgie is a love song writer, he has never had a successful, lasting relationship.  His first love, Ruthie, broke up with him after he got her pregnant and she had to have an abortion. He later met a kind waitress named Gloria whom he also got pregnant; he married Gloria and they had two children, but then he cheated on her and she asked for a divorce. More recently, he met an aging actress named Allison (Barbara Harris), who had just miserably failed an audition for a rock musical. Allison turned out to have a lot in common with him, including a failed marriage and thoughts of suicide.  When he learns it is her birthday, he takes her for a ride in his private plane and they spend one romantic evening together.

Georgie visits his aging father, who runs a small restaurant and has always had a dream of opening a bigger place. Georgie asks him why he does not move elsewhere and open the large restaurant of his dreams with the checks Georgie has sent him, instead of always sending back the checks. His father explains that he is starting to suffer the effects of arteriosclerosis and that it is too late for him to open a new restaurant now because he will soon die. Georgie goes for a ride over New York City in his private plane and looks for the cemetery where his father said he wanted to be buried. Then, he tries to call first Ruthie and then Allison on the sky phone in the plane. Neither of the women recognizes his voice, so he hangs up, but not before revealing that he is Harry Kellerman.

At the end, Georgie is shown crashing his private plane into the buildings of Manhattan, then cheerfully skiing away with his psychiatrist.

Cast
Dustin Hoffman as Georgie Soloway
Barbara Harris as Allison Densmore
Jack Warden as Dr. Solomon F. Moses
David Burns as Leon Soloway
Dom DeLuise as Irwin Marcy
Gabriel Dell as Sidney Gill
Betty Walker as Margot Soloway
Rose Gregorio as Gloria Soloway
Regina Baff as Ruthie Tresh
David Galef as Leonard Soloway

Release and reception
Roger Ebert gave the film three stars out of four and wrote that the film's "failure to come to grips with the personal meaning of suicide is the fundamental reason 'Harry Kellerman' doesn't entirely succeed. There's a certain flabbiness in its philosophy. And yet (having gotten the thoughts about suicide off my chest), I reacted very favorably to some scenes in the film, and I think Hoffman's two long scenes with Barbara Harris are among the best cinema I've seen in some time. Miss Harris has earned an Academy Award nomination hands down." Vincent Canby of The New York Times wrote "It is very glib, very funny in short takes and rather tedious and predictable in long ones, and it virtually kills itself trying to convince us that life at the top is even more anxious, more empty, than is life at the bottom, or at the middle." Arthur D. Murphy of Variety called the film "an artistic disappointment" with a "dull screenplay," noting that "entire reels could be interchanged without being evident." Gene Siskel of the Chicago Tribune gave the film 1.5 stars out of 4 and wrote "There isn't much right about 'Harry Kellerman' ... Much of the dialog is too cute ('What should I do for reality; it never did anything for me.' 'If Shakespeare wrote music, they'd all be in the top 10.' 'Doctor, I came to you in flames, and you treated me for sunburn.') And when Dustin Hoffman can't deliver these lines smoothly, you know they are stilted." Charles Champlin of the Los Angeles Times was positive, calling the film "a crackling and original work" with a "knockout performance by the admirable Mr. Hoffman." Gary Arnold of The Washington Post panned the film as a "snow job of a movie" and "another empty vessel that flatters itself as a powerful comment on emptiness." Nigel Andrews of The Monthly Film Bulletin wrote that "Ulu Grobard's film emerges as no more than an amorphous assemblage of smart ideas, whose shapelessness—in theory justified by Georgie's story being presented as reminiscences from an analyst's couch—in practice robs the film of any real dramatic momentum."

As Ebert correctly predicted, Barbara Harris received an Academy Award nomination for Best Supporting Actress.

Home media
The film has been released on VHS and was released to DVD by Paramount Pictures Home Entertainment on January 28, 2014.

Production notes
Who Is Harry Kellerman and Why Is He Saying Those Terrible Things About Me? was filmed on location in New York City in 1970. Some of the locations include the Lunt-Fontanne Theater, the General Motors Building, and Fillmore East. At the Fillmore East, Soloway performs onstage with Shel Silverstein and Dr. Hook & The Medicine Show. This scene was filmed on September 18, 1970, before a Grateful Dead concert. The concert attendees were used as extras for the scene. The soundtrack was produced by Ron Haffkine.

References

External links
 
 
 
 

1971 films
1971 comedy-drama films
American comedy-drama films
Films directed by Ulu Grosbard
Films set in New York City
Films shot in New York City
Cinema Center Films films
1970s English-language films
1970s American films